Gwendolyn Guthrie (July 9, 1950 –  February 3, 1999) was an American singer-songwriter and pianist who also sang backing vocals for Aretha Franklin, Billy Joel, Stevie Wonder, Peter Tosh, and Madonna, among others, and who wrote songs made famous by Ben E. King, Angela Bofill and Roberta Flack. Guthrie is well known for her 1986 anthem "Ain't Nothin' Goin' on But the Rent," and for her 1986 cover of the song "(They Long to Be) Close to You."

Life and career
Guthrie was born and raised in Newark, New Jersey. In school, she studied classical music, and her father began teaching her piano when she was eight years old. By the early 1970s, she had joined vocal groups such as the Ebonettes and the Matchmakers, while working as an elementary school teacher. She was a backup singer on Aretha Franklin's 1974 single "I'm in Love".

Guthrie soon began moonlighting as a singer of commercial jingles, sometimes with her friend Valerie Simpson of Ashford & Simpson fame. A song-writing partnership with then-boyfriend, trombonist/bassist Haras Fyre (professionally known as "Patrick Grant") resulted in Ben E. King's comeback single "Supernatural Thing," an R&B #1 (#5 pop) hit in 1975, and the follow-up, "Do It In the Name of Love (#4 R&B). They also wrote "This Time I'll Be Sweeter" for Angela Bofill, which was later covered by numerous artists. Together they wrote seven tracks on Sister Sledge's 1975 album Circle of Love: "Cross My Heart", "Protect Our Love", "Love Don't You Go Through No Changes on Me", "Don't You Miss Him Now", "Pain Reliever", "You're Much Better Off Loving Me", and "Fireman". She also wrote Roberta Flack's "God Don't Like Ugly".

As Guthrie's solo career developed, she worked extensively with Sly and Robbie on dub-influenced club cuts and began racking up dance hits. She was dubbed "The First Lady of the Paradise Garage," as several of her songs became anthems at that venue, helped by the frequent and dynamic performances she gave there. She soon teamed musically with famed Paradise Garage DJ Larry Levan and recorded her first major landmark hit "Padlock" in 1983 with the Compass Point All Stars in Nassau, Bahamas, which became a club and radio hit two years later. She also sang backup on Madonna's 1982 debut album.

Guthrie is probably best known for her 1986 dance anthem "Ain't Nothin' Goin' on But the Rent", a self-written and produced track that garnered some controversy for its materialistic lyrics such as: "You've got to have a j-o-b if you want to be with me/No romance without finance."
 
"Ain't Nothin' Goin' on But the Rent" was later sampled by numerous dance and hip hop artists, notably by Foxy Brown in her 1998 song "JOB" featuring Mýa, and by Utah Saints for the original version of their hit "What Can You Do for Me." The song is referenced in the Eddie Murphy monologue "No Romance without Finance" in his Eddie Murphy Raw comedy special. Guthrie also had a hit in 1986 with a cover of "(They Long to Be) Close to You," which reached number twenty-five on the UK Singles Chart the same year.

Her 1988 single "Can't Love You Tonight" boldly addressed AIDS at a time when the disease was a rather taboo subject. Guthrie was an ally of the gay community, and of people with AIDS. Proceeds from the single went to the AIDS Coalition.

Other club hits by Guthrie include the Compass Point All Stars-produced "Seventh Heaven," "Peanut Butter," and "Peek-a-Boo." "Padlock" was later covered by M People, who included it on their 1995 album Bizarre Fruit, featuring vocalist Heather Small.

Death
Guthrie died of uterine cancer on February 3, 1999, at the age of 48, and was interred at Fairmount Cemetery in Newark, New Jersey.

Discography

Studio albums

Extended plays

Compilation albums
Ticket to Ride (1987, 4th & B'way)
Ultimate Collection (1999, Hip-O)

Singles

Notes

References

External links
 
 
 
 Patrick Grant (Haras Fyre) at Fyremusic.com
 Podcast feature on Guthrie's life

1950 births
1999 deaths
20th-century African-American women singers
20th-century American pianists
20th-century American singers
20th-century American women pianists
20th-century American women singers
African-American pianists
African-American songwriters
African-American women singer-songwriters
American boogie musicians
American dance musicians
American disco musicians
American rhythm and blues singer-songwriters
American soul singers
Burials at Fairmount Cemetery (Newark, New Jersey)
Deaths from cancer in New Jersey
Deaths from uterine cancer
Island Records artists
Musicians from Newark, New Jersey
People from Okemah, Oklahoma
Polydor Records artists
Reprise Records artists
Singer-songwriters from New Jersey
Singer-songwriters from New York (state)
Singer-songwriters from Oklahoma
Warner Records artists